Laval-Atger is a former commune in the Lozère department in southern France. On 1 January 2017, it was merged into the new commune Saint-Bonnet-Laval. Its population was 153 in 2019.

Geography
The Chapeauroux forms most of the commune's south-western border, flows northeastward through the commune, then forms part of its north-eastern border.

See also
Communes of the Lozère department

References

Lavalatger